Aspindza (Aspindzis munitsipalit'et'i) is a municipality in southern Georgia, in the region of Samtskhe-Javakheti with a population of 10,372 (2021).

Administrative divisions
Aspindza municipality is administratively divided into one borough (დაბა, daba), the municipal centre Aspindza and 18 communities (თემი, temi) with 55 villages (სოფელი, sopeli):

Politics
Aspindza Municipal Assembly (Georgian: ახალციხის საკრებულო, Aspindza Sakrebulo) is a representative body in Aspindza Municipality, consisting of 30 members which are elected every four years. The last election was held in October 2021. Rostom Magraqvelidze of Georgian Dream was elected mayor.

Population 

By the start of 2021 the population was determined at 10,587 people, a slight increase compared to the 2014 census. The population of Aspindza town decreased slightly during the same period.

The population consists for 86% of Georgians. By far the largest ethnic minority are the Armenians, who make up more than 13% of the population. Almost all of them live in the village of Damala, just outside the main town of Aspindza. Furthermore, some Russians, Ossetes, Ukrainians and Greeks live in the municipality. The population consists for 74.8% of followers of the Georgian Orthodox Church and 11.6% is Muslim followed by followers of the Armenian Apostolic Church (almost 10%), Catholics (2.3%) and a small community of several dozen Jehovah's Witnesses.

In November 1944, the Meskhetian Turks, a Turkic-speaking ethnic group of predominantly Muslim faith living in this area, were deported to Soviet Central Asian republics as part of a Stalinist resettlement operation. At that time, the Meskhetians constituted two-thirds of the population of the rajon Aspindza (1939: 21,612 of the 32,644 inhabitants). Attempts to return them to independent Georgia have failed, with local resistance.

See also 

 List of municipalities in Georgia (country)

References

Municipalities of Samtskhe–Javakheti